LPN is a Licensed practical nurse in North America.

LPN or Lpn may also refer to:
 Lao People's Navy
 Lee Presson and the Nails, American swing band
 Lars Petter Nordhaug, Norwegian cyclist
 Learning Parity with Noise, a type of machine learning algorithm that allows for errors
 License plate number, a unique identifier for motor vehicles

See also
 Longview, Portland and Northern Railway, American railroad known as LP&N
 Low-power network (disambiguation), low-power sensor networks of various topologies